Group C of the 2019 CONCACAF Gold Cup took place from 17 to 25 June 2019. The group consisted of Curaçao, El Salvador, Honduras, and co-hosts Jamaica. The top two teams, Jamaica and Curaçao, advanced to the knockout stage.

Teams

Notes

Standings

In the quarter-finals:
The winners of Group C, Jamaica, advanced to play the runners-up of Group D, Panama.
The runners-up of Group C, Curaçao, advanced to play the winners of Group D, the United States.

Matches

Curaçao vs El Salvador

Jamaica vs Honduras

El Salvador vs Jamaica

Honduras vs Curaçao

Jamaica vs Curaçao

Honduras vs El Salvador

Discipline
Fair play points would have been used as tiebreakers if the overall and head-to-head records of teams were tied. These were calculated based on yellow and red cards received in all group matches as follows:
first yellow card: minus 1 point;
indirect red card (second yellow card): minus 3 points;
direct red card: minus 4 points;
yellow card and direct red card: minus 5 points;

Only one of the above deductions were applied to a player in a single match.

References

External links
 

Group C